The 2019–20 season was Chelsea Women's 28th competitive season and 10th consecutive season in the FA Women's Super League, the top flight of English women's football.

Review

2019 FIFA Women's World Cup
This season begin with the 2019 FIFA Women's World Cup in France from 7 June to 7 July 2019. A total of twelve players are across the Channel with six different countries, making Chelsea the best-represented English club. England are taking the most players from Chelsea, as midfielder and club captain Karen Carney, center back Millie Bright, goalkeeper Carly Telford, and 2017-18 FWA, PFA Women's Players' Player of the Year and inaugural Ballon d’Or Féminin nominee Fran Kirby are all headed to France with The Lionesses. Blues defender Maria Thorisdottir and midfielder Maren Mjelde will both be heading to the World Cup for Norway along with the new signing Guro Reiten. Sweden will be taking Chelsea left back Jonna Andersson, versatile defender Magdalena Eriksson, and departing star goalkeeper Hedvig Lindahl. Chelsea left back and New Zealand captain Ali Riley debuted for the Football Ferns in 2007 and will be playing in her fourth World Cup. South Korea and Scotland taking one each of Chelsea players such as Ji So-yun and Erin Cuthbert.

Squad information

First team squad

New contracts

Transfers and loans

In

Out

Coaching staff
{|class="wikitable"
|-
!Position
!Staff
|-
|Manager|| Emma Hayes
|-
|Assistant Manager|| Paul Green
|-
|Coach|| TJ O'Leary
|-
|Goalkeeper coach|| Stuart Searle

Non-competitive

Pre-season

Competitions

Women's Super League

League table

Results summary

Results by matchday

Matches

Note: The FA confirmed the termination of the 2019/20 Women’s Super League due to the COVID-19 pandemic.

FA Cup

League Cup

Group stage

Group D

Knockout phase

Statistics

Appearances and goals

|-
|colspan="14"|Goalkeepers:
|-

|-
|colspan="14"|Defenders:
|-

|-
|colspan="14"|Midfielders:
|-

|-
|colspan="14"|Forwards:
|-

Goalscorers
Includes all competitive matches. The list is sorted by squad number when total goals are equal.

Assists
Includes all competitive matches. The list is sorted by squad number when total assists are equal.

Clean sheets
Includes all competitive matches. The list is sorted by squad number when total clean sheets are equal.

Awards

References

Chelsea F.C. Women seasons